Ronald (Ron) L Rogers (May 13, 1954 – January 7, 2020) was an African-American political cartoonist, designer, and illustrator. His work was published in Richmond Planet from 1980 to 1988, in books and greeting cards throughout his career, in the South Bend Tribune until 2010, and in the Winston-Salem Chronicle from 2014 to 2018. Rogers passed away at age 65 due to sudden illness.

Early life 
Ron Rogers was born on May 13, 1954. He was born in Richmond, Virginia, where he grew up and lived for most of his life. Rogers began showing his passion and talent for art at a young age, where he began creating his first comic series. He graduated from Maggie L Walker High School in 1974 and attended both Virginia Commonwealth University and J. Sargeant Reynolds Community College, where he studied art, history, and politics.

Career 
Ron Rogers began his career as a freelancer for The Richmond Afro-American and Planet in 1980. His works were published in said magazine thought 1988. Throughout his entire career, Rogers' works appeared in publications all across the South. In 2005, Rogers joined the South Bend Tribune following many instances of freelance work for the paper since 2002. He was laid off in 2010. Throughout his career, Rogers designed cards and graphics that appears across the US. He played the role of graphics editor, graphics director, and assistant design editor at many newspapers in Indiana, Alabama, and Louisiana.

In 2014, Ron Rogers joined the Winston-Salem Chronicle as a cartoonist and designer, where he worked until 2018 when he retired. After retirement, Rogers continued to freelance for the same newspaper until his death in 2020.

Awards and Honors 

 Three Statewide Editorial Cartoonist Awards in Louisiana
 Two Statewide Editorial Cartoonist Awards in Indiana
 National Recognition for Cartooning in the Suburban Newspapers of America
 Various Illustration Awards
 Featured in Editor & Publisher

References

External links 

 getintoon: Ron Rogers Visual Commentary
 Ron Rogers' Official Twittter

1954 births
2020 deaths
People from Richmond, Virginia
Virginia Commonwealth University alumni
American cartoonists
African-American illustrators
20th-century African-American people
21st-century African-American people